Charles Stuart Knightley (born 3 February 1972) is a former English cricketer.  Knightley was a left-handed batsman who fielded occasionally as a wicket-keeper.  He was born in Cheltenham, Gloucestershire.

Knightley made his debut for Oxfordshire in the 1996 Minor Counties Championship against Shropshire.  Knightley played Minor counties cricket for Oxfordshire from 1996 to 2010, which included 75 Minor Counties Championship matches and 21 MCCA Knockout Trophy matches.  He made his List A debut against Lancashire in the 1996 NatWest Trophy.  He played 5 further List A matches, the last coming against Herefordshire in the 1st round of the 2004 Cheltenham & Gloucester Trophy which was held in 2003.  In his 6 List A matches he scored 109 runs at a batting average of 27.25, with a high score of 61*.  His only half century came against Lancashire in the 1996 NatWest Trophy.

He has previously played for the Gloucestershire Second XI in 1995.

References

External links
Charles Knightley at ESPNcricinfo
Charles Knightley at CricketArchive

1972 births
Living people
Sportspeople from Cheltenham
English cricketers
Oxfordshire cricketers